Regis Francis Leheny (January 5, 1908 – November 2, 1976) was a relief pitcher in Major League Baseball who played briefly for the Boston Red Sox during the 1932 season. He was born in Pittsburgh, Pennsylvania.

In a two-game career, Leheny posted a 16.88 ERA with one strikeout and three walks in 2.2 innings of work. He did not have a decision.

Leheny died in his hometown of Pittsburgh, Pennsylvania, at age 68.

See also
1932 Boston Red Sox season

External links

Boston Red Sox players
Major League Baseball pitchers
Baseball players from Pittsburgh
1908 births
1976 deaths
Burials at Calvary Catholic Cemetery (Pittsburgh)
Toronto Maple Leafs (International League) players